Adam Khan (born 24 May 1985) is a British sportsman and racing driver of Pakistani descent. Having competed in the Euro3000 series in 2008, and despite missing the first four races he narrowly missed out on the championship. His performances were spotted by the bosses at Renault F1 and he became their F1 test and demonstration driver in 2009 alongside Fernando Alonso and Nelson Piquet Jr.

Adam Khan is a regular guest on BBC Asian Network Radio.

According to a reply in his comment on a Youtube video titled "The Mysterious Disappearance of Adrian Sutil", he states he is retired from racing and occasionally does trackday coaching for his friends.

Racing record

Career summary
		
(1) = Team standings.
† At the Durban round he was injured after crash in practice sessions.

Complete A1 Grand Prix results
(key) (Races in bold indicate pole position) (Races in italics indicate fastest lap)

Complete GP2 Series results

Complete GP2 Asia Series results
(key) (Races in bold indicate pole position) (Races in italics indicate fastest lap)

References

External links
Home Page
A1 Team Pakistan
RacingPakistan.com | Official Racing Pakistan Web Site
Adam Khan pledges to wear Pakistan Flag at races
Khan joins Euroseries 3000
Khan preparing for new A1GP season
First win for Khan in Euro 3000
Khan 2009 Renault F1 Demonstration driver

1985 births
Living people
People from Bridlington
English people of Pakistani descent
Alumni of King's College London
English racing drivers
British Formula Three Championship drivers
German Formula Three Championship drivers
Formula Renault V6 Eurocup drivers
A1 Team Pakistan drivers
A1 Grand Prix team owners
Auto GP drivers
GP2 Asia Series drivers
Sportspeople from Yorkshire
British sportspeople of Pakistani descent
Arden International drivers
A1 Grand Prix drivers
DAMS drivers
Performance Racing drivers
Alan Docking Racing drivers
Pakistani racing drivers
Super Nova Racing drivers